Maienschein is a surname. Notable people with the surname include:

Brian Maienschein, American politician
Jane Maienschein (born 1950), American scientist

Surnames of German origin